

European record 
As of 7 March 2023.

Matches 
 Q = qualification round
 PO = play-off
 R = round
 Group = group stage / Group 1 = first group stage / Group 2 = second group stage
 1/8 = eighth finals / 1/4 = quarter-finals / 1/2 = semi-finals
 F = final
 PUC = points UEFA coefficient

Total points for UEFA coefficient: 287.0.

Summary of best results 
From the quarter-finals upwards:

(2 finals)

European Cup / UEFA Champions League (1):
- finalists in 1978
- quarter-finalists in 1977
- group stage (last 8) in 1993
UEFA Cup Winners' Cup:
- semi-finalists in 1992
- quarter-finalists in 1971 and 1995
UEFA Cup / UEFA Europa League (1):
- finalists in 1976
- semi-finalists in 1988
- quarter-finalists in 2015

References

External links
Club website

European football
Brugge